Korochin is a rural locality (a khutor) in Kapustinoyarsky Selsoviet of Akhtubinsky District, Astrakhan Oblast, Russia. The population was 32 as of 2010. There is 1 street.

Geography 
Korochin is located 65 km northwest of Akhtubinsk (the district's administrative centre) by road. Duyunov is the nearest rural locality.

References 

Rural localities in Akhtubinsky District